Elections to Sheffield City Council were held on 1 May 1980. The whole council was up for election, with the Attercliffe ward now merged into Darnall and Gleadless ward changed to Norton.

Election result

This result had the following consequences for the total number of seats on the Council after the elections:

Ward results

References

1980 English local elections
1980
1980s in Sheffield